Cortinarius armillatus, commonly known as the red-banded cortinarius, is a late summer and autumn (as late as in October) fungus usually found in moist coniferous forests, especially spruced ones. The species grows rarely in North America, but is common in Europe.

Elias Magnus Fries described the species in 1838.

The cap is bell shaped at first, later flattening out, vividly rust-brown becoming  slightly paler with age, with small fibrous scales. The cap grows from 5 to 15 cm in diameter.
The gills are dark rust-brown; broad, distant and shallowly sinuate.
The spores are also rust-brown.
The flesh is light brown.

Uses
The species is considered either edible but mediocre or inedible. The fruit body has been found to contain orellanine, though at much lower concentrations than the lethal webcaps.

When dyeing cloths, without added metals, it discharges pink, with tin yellow, with copper green and with iron olivic dyes.

References

External links

armillatus
Fungi of Europe
Fungi described in 1838